Zipp McCoy Duncan (born July 15, 1987) is a former American football guard. He was signed by the Philadelphia Eagles as an undrafted free agent in 2010. He played college football at Kentucky.

Duncan was also a member of the Edmonton Eskimos, Dallas Vigilantes and Philadelphia Soul.

Early years
Duncan was born and raised in Magnolia, Kentucky. He is the son of Steve and Fonda Duncan. Duncan has three younger siblings Drey, Christian, and Christina Duncan. Zipp attended Elizabethtown High School in Elizabethtown, Kentucky and graduated in 2005, along with football teammates Brandon Deaderick and Chris Todd.

Duncan played under his father Steve Duncan who was an assistant coach. Duncans father also coached at Ft. Knox, Lone Oak high school and Murray High School.

College career
Duncan played college football at the University of Kentucky. He played in 12 games as a tight end before switching over to the offensive line in 2007. As a senior in 2009, Duncan earned second-team All-SEC honors as a left tackle.

Professional career

Philadelphia Eagles
Duncan was signed by the Philadelphia Eagles as an undrafted free agent following the 2010 NFL Draft on April 26, 2010.
 He was waived on August 28.

Present day
He is a football coach at Dublin Jerome High school in Dublin Ohio

References

External links
Philadelphia Eagles bio

1987 births
Living people
American football offensive guards
American football offensive tackles
American football tight ends
Edmonton Elks players
Kentucky Wildcats football players
People from Elizabethtown, Kentucky
Philadelphia Eagles players
Dallas Vigilantes players
Philadelphia Soul players